The Old Mosque or Sulejman Pasha mosque was the founding mosque of the Albanian capital Tirana. The city developed  around the mosque, which was founded by the Ottoman Albanian Pasha Sulejman Bargjini along with a hamam and a bakery. In the mid of the 20th century, all of it have been razed to make place for the Communist-era Unknown Soldier statue.

History 
Built in 1614, it was the oldest mosque of the city of Tirana and was one of the oldest mosques in Albania. The Ottoman general and ethnic Albanian, Sulejman Bargjini had fought for the Ottomans against the Safavids in Persia (Iran).

Because of its beautiful minaret and its frescoe paintings, the Old Mosque stood in rivalry with the Et'hem Bey Mosque founded by Sulejman Bargjini's descendant Molla Bey of Petrela in 1793 and finished by his son Haxhi Etëhem Bey Mollaj. Next to the Sulejman Pasha mosque was the Sulejman Pasha Tomb. The Kapllan Pasha Tomb is in the same neighbourhood.

The mosque was destroyed in the Second World War. Despite funds collected by the people of Tirana to rebuild the mosque, its remains and its minaret which still stood were destroyed in 1967 by the new Communist government under Enver Hoxha who also destroyed the Dine Hoxha mosque in Tirana. The monument of the "Unknown Soldier" was constructed on its site instead.

See also
 Islam in Albania

References

Buildings and structures demolished in 1944
Ottoman architecture in Albania
Mosques in Tirana
Religious buildings and structures completed in 1614
Mosques destroyed by communists
Demolished buildings and structures in Albania